Germaine Michel (7 November 1892 – 9 January 1976) was a French stage and film actress. She was born in Paris and died in Clichy-la-Garenne.

Selected filmography
 The Wandering Beast (1932)
 Cognasse (1932)
 Paprika (1933)
 On the Streets (1933)
 600,000 Francs a Month (1933)
 Rothchild (1934)
 Tovaritch (1935)
 Mercadet (1936)
 The Man of the Hour (1937)
 Three Waltzes (1938)
 The Porter from Maxim's (1939)
 As Long as I Live (1946)
 Special Mission (1946)
 Pastoral Symphony (1946)
 To the Eyes of Memory (1948)
 The Cupid Club (1949)
 The Mystery of the Yellow Room (1949)
 At the Grand Balcony (1949)
 Three Telegrams (1950)
 Gas-Oil (1955)
 Maigret Sets a Trap (1958)

External links

1892 births
1976 deaths
French stage actresses
French film actresses
French silent film actresses
Actresses from Paris
20th-century French actresses